Claus Bille (ca. 1490 – 4 January 1558 at Lyngsgård, Scania) was a Danish statesman. He was a major estate owner, knight (the highest rank of Danish nobility), fief lord of Båhus Castle and a member of both the Norwegian and the Danish Councils of the Realm. He was an important participant in the Stockholm Bloodbath, when he together with Søren Norby arrested the Swedish nobility. He was a first cousin of Eske Bille, and the Bille family became the most politically powerful noble family of Denmark during his lifetime.

Claus Bille was the father of Beate Clausdatter Bille and thus the maternal grandfather of the astronomer Tycho Brahe. Direct descendents include actress Judi Dench and French and Danish lawyer Steen Andersen Oluf Bille (b. 1964).

References

16th-century Danish politicians
Claus
1490 births
1558 deaths
People from Scania
Stockholm Bloodbath